The 2016–17 season was FCSB's 69th season since its founding in 1947.

Players

First team squad

Transfers

In

Out

Spending
Summer:   €3,700,000

Winter:   €2,790,000

Total:    €6,490,000

Income
Summer:   €13,450,000

Winter:   €1,600,000

Total:    €15,050,000

Statistics

Goalscorers
Last updated on 13 May 2017 (UTC)

Competitions

Liga I

Regular season

Table

Position by round

Results

Championship round

Table

Position by round

Results

Cupa României

Results

Cupa Ligii

Results

UEFA Champions League

Qualifying rounds

Third qualifying round

Play-off round

UEFA Europa League

Group stage

Results

Non competitive matches

See also

 2016–17 Cupa României
 2016–17 Cupa Ligii
 2016–17 Liga I
 2016–17 UEFA Champions League
 2016–17 UEFA Europa League

Notes and references

FC Steaua București seasons
Steaua București
Steaua București
Steaua